The 1976 National Football League draft was an annual player selection meeting held April 8–9, 1976, at the Roosevelt Hotel in New York City, New York.

The draft lasted 17 rounds, with the expansion Tampa Bay Buccaneers and Seattle Seahawks making the first two selections. The Buccaneers were awarded the first overall pick of the draft after winning a draw over the Seahawks, and used that pick to select defensive tackle Lee Roy Selmon. The expansion teams were also given a pair of extra picks at the end of each of rounds 2-5. The 1976 draft was the final NFL draft to last seventeen rounds; it was reduced to twelve rounds in 1977, and it was the first draft to officially have the infamous unofficial award, "Mr. Irrelevant", for the final player selected. Like 1974, the 1976 draft is generally regarded as one of the worst quarterback draft classes of all time. No quarterback from the 1976 draft class ever reached the Pro Bowl, an All-Pro team or a Super Bowl, and according to the estimate of Eldorado this quarterback class was the second-worst after 1996. Only first round pick Richard Todd, who led the New York Jets to their first postseason appearances since Super Bowl III in 1981 and 1982, was ever a regular starter.

Five teams lost picks as a penalty for illegally signing former World Football League players: the New York Giants and Chicago Bears lost sixth-round picks, the Washington Redskins lost their seventh-round pick, and the Atlanta Falcons and New York Jets lost their tenth-round selections.

The college draft was originally scheduled for February 3–4, but was postponed when the owners of the Seahawks and Buccaneers filed a lawsuit against the players' union with worries that the organization would try to prevent the expansion draft. The court case delayed both the expansion draft and the annual college draft.

Player selections

Round one

Round two

Round three

Round four

Round five

Round six

Round seven

Round eight

Round nine

Round ten

Round eleven

Round twelve

Round thirteen

Round fourteen

Round fifteen

Round sixteen

Round seventeen

Hall of Famers
 Steve Largent, wide receiver from Tulsa, taken 4th round 117th overall by Houston Oilers
Inducted: Professional Football Hall of Fame class of 1995.
 Lee Roy Selmon, defensive end from Oklahoma, taken 1st round 1st overall by Tampa Bay Buccaneers
Inducted: Professional Football Hall of Fame class of 1995.
 Mike Haynes, cornerback from Arizona State, taken 1st round 5th overall by New England Patriots
Inducted: Professional Football Hall of Fame class of 1997.
 Jackie Slater, offensive tackle from Jackson State, taken 3rd round 86th overall by Los Angeles Rams
Inducted: Professional Football Hall of Fame class of 2001.
 Harry Carson, linebacker from South Carolina State, taken 4th round 105th overall by New York Giants
Inducted: Professional Football Hall of Fame class of 2006.

Notable undrafted players

References

External links
 NFL.com – 1976 Draft 
 databaseFootball.com – 1976 Draft
 Pro Football Hall of Fame

National Football League Draft
NFL Draft
Draft
NFL Draft
NFL Draft
American football in New York City
1970s in Manhattan
Sporting events in New York City
Sports in Manhattan